Encke is a lunar impact crater that is located on the western edge of the Mare Insularum, to the south-southeast of the crater Kepler. The small crater Kunowsky lies to the east-southeast on the mare.

The crater is named after German mathematician and astronomer Johann Franz Encke.

The rim of Encke is low and somewhat polygonal in shape. The tiny craterlet Encke N lies across the western rim. The floor is somewhat uneven, and is covered in ray material from the nearby Kepler. The high albedo of this ejecta makes Encke a bright feature when the Sun is at a high elevation over the lunar surface.

Satellite craters
By convention these features are identified on lunar maps by placing the letter on the side of the crater midpoint that is closest to Encke.

References

 
 
 
 
 
 
 
 
 
 
 

Impact craters on the Moon